Victor Perez (born 2 September 1992) is a French professional golfer who plays on the European Tour. He won the 2019 Alfred Dunhill Links Championship, as well as the 2023 Abu Dhabi HSBC Championship.

Amateur career
Perez attended the University of New Mexico from 2011 to 2015.  He represented France in the 2014 Eisenhower Trophy, where he was the joint-second lowest individual scorer behind Jon Rahm.

Professional career
Perez finished second in the Alps Tour qualifying school in December 2015 to earn a place on the tour for 2016. He was runner-up in the Open Frassanelle and won the Alps de Las Castillas, finishing the season fifth in the Order of Merit to earn a place on the 2017 Challenge Tour.

In his first season on the Challenge Tour Perez finished 18th in the Order of Merit, just outside the top-15 that gained cards for the European Tour. He was runner-up in the Made in Denmark Challenge and won the Challenge de España.

In his second season on the Challenge Tour, Perez finished 3rd in the Order of Merit which obtained him a place on the 2019 European Tour. He ended the 2018 season by winning the Foshan Open after a playoff with  Robert MacIntyre, and then finishing second behind Adri Arnaus in the Ras Al Khaimah Challenge Tour Grand Final. He also earned his first European Tour top 10 by finishing 6th in the Belgian Knockout in May.

Perez made a good start to the 2019 European Tour, finishing joint 3rd in the first event of the season, the Honma Hong Kong Open, played in November 2018. In September 2019, Perez earned his first European Tour victory by winning the Alfred Dunhill Links Championship. He tied for 4th place in the 2019 WGC-HSBC Champions and the following week was joint runner-up in the Turkish Airlines Open after a six-man playoff. Perez finished the European Tour season 13th on the Race to Dubai and ended 2019 at 45th in the Official World Golf Ranking to qualify for the 2020 Masters Tournament, his first major championship.

In January 2020, Perez finished tied-for-second at the Abu Dhabi HSBC Championship. He finished runner-up again in October 2020, at the BMW PGA Championship.

In May 2022, Perez won the Dutch Open in a playoff over Ryan Fox. He holed two long-range putts on the third and fourth playoff holes to extend and eventually win the playoff. It was his second European Tour victory.

In January 2023, Perez won the Abu Dhabi HSBC Championship. He shot a final-round 66 to win by one shot ahead of Min Woo Lee and Sebastian Söderberg.

Personal life

Perez was born in Séméac in southwestern France, and he studied psychology at the University of New Mexico. 

In 2017 he moved from France to Dundee, Scotland.

Amateur wins
2010 Grand Prix du Medoc
2012 Aggie Invitational, Grand Prix des Landes-Hossegor
2013 Grand Prix de Chiberta

Professional wins (7)

European Tour wins (3)

European Tour playoff record (1–1)

Challenge Tour wins (2)

1Co-sanctioned by the China Tour

Challenge Tour playoff record (1–0)

Alps Tour wins (1)

French Tour wins (1)

Results in major championships
Results not in chronological order in 2020.

CUT = missed the half-way cut
"T" = tied
NT = No tournament due to COVID-19 pandemic

Results in The Players Championship

"T" indicates a tie for a place

Results in World Golf Championships

1Cancelled due to COVID-19 pandemic

NT = no tournament
"T" = tied

Team appearances
Amateur
Eisenhower Trophy (representing France): 2014

Professional
Hero Cup (representing Continental Europe): 2023 (winners)

See also
2018 Challenge Tour graduates

References

External links

French male golfers
New Mexico Lobos men's golfers
Sportspeople from Tarbes
Sportspeople from Dundee
French expatriate sportspeople in Scotland
1992 births
Living people